Brenda Taylor may refer to:

Brenda Taylor (hurdler) (born 1979), American Olympic hurdler
Brenda Taylor (rower) (born 1962), Canadian Olympic gold medalist in rowing